Giacomo Rossi Stuart (25 August 1925 – 20 October 1994) was an Italian film actor often credited as Jack Stuart or Giacomo Rossi-Stuart. He appeared in more than 80 films between 1953 and 1989.

Biography
Born in Todi to an Italian father and a Scottish mother, Stuart was a highly successful athlete when young; he competed in the pentathlon. After getting interested in acting, he studied at Actors Studio in New York City. 

Between the late 1950s and the late 1970s he was a major actor in Italian genre cinema. His children also went into acting: son  Kim Rossi Stuart and daughter Valentina Rossi Stuart, who also is a stuntwoman.

Selected filmography

 Jeunes mariés (1953)
 The Red Cloak (1955)
 War and Peace (1956) - Young Cossack (uncredited)
 Londra chiama Polo Nord (1956) - Henry
 A Farewell to Arms (1957) - Carabiniere (uncredited)
 The Silent Enemy (1958) - Rosati
 Il Conte di Matera (1958) - Duca Paolo Bressi
 The Day the Sky Exploded (1958) - Stuart (uncredited)
 Knight Without a Country (1959) - Ruggero
 Caltiki - The Immortal Monster (1959) - Prof. Rodríguez's Assistant
 The Night of the Great Attack (1959) - Count Fabio
 Five Branded Women (1960)
 Slave of Rome (1961) - Claudius
 Invasion 1700 (1962)
 Sodom and Gomorrah (1962) - Ishmael
 The Reluctant Saint (1962)
 The Avenger (1962) - Euryalus
 Catherine of Russia (1963) - Count Poniatowski
 Zorro and the Three Musketeers (1963) - Athos
 Duello nel Texas (1963) - Sheriff Lance Corbett
 I diavoli di Spartivento (1963)
 The Last Man on Earth (1964) - Ben Cortman
 Temple of the White Elephant (1964) - Reginald Milliner
 Grand Canyon Massacre (1964) - Sheriff Burt Cooley
 Seven Slaves Against the World (1964) - Gaius
 The Revenge of Spartacus (1964) - Fulvius
 Kidnapped to Mystery Island (1964) - Tremal Naik
 Badmen of the West (1964) - Marshal Gary Smith
 Duel at Sundown (1965) - Quents
 Degueyo (1966) - Norman Sandel
 Knives of the Avenger (1966) - King Arald
 Kill, Baby, Kill (1966) - Dr. Paul Eswai
 War Between the Planets (1966) - Cmdr. Rod Jackson
 Ring Around the World (1966) - The Killer
 Perry Grant, agente di ferro (1966) - Roland
 Snow Devils (1967) - Cmdr. Rod Jackson
 The Glass Sphinx (1967) - Ray
 Occhio per occhio, dente per dente (1967) - Jeff Gordon
 Ragan (1968) - Kohler
 Zorro the Fox (1968) - Don Pedro
 Colpo sensazionale al servizio del Sifar (1968)
 Indovina chi viene a merenda? (1969) - Comandante del Lager
 The Battle of the Damned (1969) - Major Carter
 Viaje al vacío (1969) - Gert Muller
 El 'Che' Guevara (1969) - Prado
 The Five Man Army (1969) - Mexican Officer
 Rendezvous with Dishonour (1970) - Lt. Tibbitt
 El último día de la guerra (1970) - Pvt. Kendall
 Churchill's Leopards (1970) - Major Powell
 Hornets' Nest (1970) - Sgt. Schwalberg
 The Weekend Murders (1970) - Ted Collins
 Kill Django... Kill First (1971) - Johnny
 Something Creeping in The Dark (1971) - Donald Forres
 The Night Evelyn Came Out of the Grave (1971) - Dr. Richard Timberlane
 The Double (1971) - Giovanni's Brother
 Ben and Charlie (1972) - Hawkins, Pinkerton detective
 The Godfather (1972) - G.I. (uncredited)
 Sei iellato, amico hai incontrato Sacramento (1972) - Tom Murdock
 Sette scialli di seta gialla (1972) - Victor Morgan
 Super Bitch (1973) - Marco
 Death Smiles at a Murderer (1973) - Dr. von Ravensbrück / Walter's Father
 La ragazza fuoristrada (1973) - Giulio Morganti
 Peccato mortale (1973) - Richard Leighton
 My Name Is Shanghai Joe (1973) - Tricky the Gambler
 La ragazza dalla pelle di luna (1974)
 Last Days of Mussolini (1974) - Jack Donati
 La minorenne (1974) - Carlo Salvi
 Drama of the Rich (1974) - Riccardo Murri
 Zorro (1975) - Fritz von Merkel
 Reflections in Black (1975) - Anselmi
 The Bloodsucker Leads the Dance (1975) - Count Richard Marnack
 Emanuelle in Bangkok (1976) - Jimmy
 Terror in Rome (1976) - Stefano's father
 Casanova & Co. (1977) - Marquis Coppafrata (uncredited)
 La notte dell'alta marea (1977) - Guide
 The Biggest Battle (1978) - American Commando Leader
 War of the Robots (1978) - Roger
 Covert Action (1978) - Grant
 Blue Nude (1978) - Donovan
 7 ragazze di classe (1979) - Enrico Cavallari
 Velvet Hands (1979) - Aufsichtsrat bei Suisse Assurance (uncredited)
 Tempi di guerra (1987) - Professor Amundsen
 Le porte dell'inferno (1989) - Dr. Johns

References

External links
 
 

1925 births
1994 deaths
People from Todi
Italian male film actors
Italian people of Scottish descent
20th-century Italian male actors
Actors Studio alumni